Loretto Academy of the Immaculate Conception in Woodlawn-Chicago is a former Catholic high school for girls in Chicago's Woodlawn neighborhood.

History
The school was established by the Loreto Sisters and opened in August 1906. The school admitted its first African-American students in 1949. As Woodlawn's demographics changed in the 1950s, the school's did as well. By 1960, it had only ten Euro-American students and by the early 1970s it had a completely African-American student body. The school closed in 1972. The building was sold to the Woodlawn Community Development Corporation and served as substance abuse treatment center called Entry House. Entry House closed in 2012, and the building was sold at a foreclosure auction on October 28, 2019. It was included in Preservation Chicago's 7 Most Endangered list in 2019.

References

1906 establishments in Illinois
Buildings and structures in Chicago
Educational institutions established in 1906
Educational institutions disestablished in 1972
Former high schools in Illinois
Defunct private schools in Chicago
Defunct Catholic secondary schools in Illinois
Sisters of Loreto schools